Hamilton Hill is a character appearing in American comic books published by DC Comics. He is a known Mayor of Gotham City and adversary of Batman.

Publication history
Hamilton Hill first appeared in Detective Comics #503 (1981) and was created by Gerry Conway and Don Newton.

Fictional character biography
Hamilton Hill is originally presented as a corrupt politician running against city councilman Arthur Reeves in Gotham City's mayoral election. Hill defeats Reeves and becomes the new Mayor of Gotham City after the councilman's photos purporting to reveal Batman's identity turn out to be faked. Unbeknownst to the citizens, Hill is in league with crime lord Rupert Thorne, who helped him become mayor in exchange for Hill granting him favors. 

During his time in office, he assists Thorne's attempts to identify and defeat Batman. He also hires an assassin to take out police detective Harvey Bullock. When Bullock survives the hit and confronts Hill, he shoots Bullock (who survives), although Hill is able to cover up the shooting and preserve his public image.

Hill later fires Police Commissioner James Gordon and replaces him with one of Thorne's cronies, Peter Pauling. After Thorne is brought down and Pauling is murdered in cold blood, Hill re-instates Gordon, but spends the rest of his tenure as Mayor trying to shift the blame for Gotham's problems onto Gordon's shoulders.

Hill makes his own attempt to get rid of Batman by accusing him of a crime that was actually committed by the Nightslayer. When Batman defeats Nightslayer and exposes Hill's plot, Hill is exposed for the man he really is and is promptly removed from office.

In 2016, DC Comics implemented another relaunch of its books called "DC Rebirth" which restored its continuity to a form much as it was prior to "The New 52". While Hill's corruption is still intact, he is revealed to have a son named Hamilton Hill Jr. who works as the deputy mayor of Mayor Michael Akins. During a discussion with Akins, Batman even brought up his choice of having Hamilton Hill Jr. be his deputy mayor.

In other media

Television
 Mayor Hamilton Hill appears in Batman: The Animated Series, voiced by Lloyd Bochner. This version is much less corrupt than his comics counterpart, and is originally hostile to Batman but later grows to respect him. He is also frequently targeted by Clock King, whom he unintentionally caused to become a villain by making him late for a court case, which he subsequently lost.
 Lloyd Bochner reprises his role of Mayor Hamilton Hill in The New Batman Adventures. In "Over the Edge", Mayor Hill confronts Commissioner Gordon about his hunt for Batman following Barbara Gordon's death. He states that he is not sure that Bruce Wayne is a murderer as Batman has saved him many times that the district attorney's office wanted a full investigation. When Commissioner Gordon didn't want to stop his hunt for Batman, Mayor Hill leaves advising Gordon to retire after his daughter's funeral. The events of this episode turned out to be result of Barbara having been affected by Scarecrow's fear gas.
 In Batman Beyond, the high school that Terry McGinnis attends is named Hamilton Hill High School (or "Hill High"), presumably after the now-deceased Hamilton Hill.
 Hamilton Hill appears in The Batman episode "The Batman/Superman Story", voiced by Lex Lang. This version is African-American, and became mayor after Marion Grange resigned following an invasion by The Joining.
 Mayor Hamilton Hill appears in the Young Justice episode "Alpha Male", voiced by Corey Burton. He is involved in a tiger-poaching ring that is attacked by Monsieur Mallah. A headline in a Gotham newspaper later reveals that Hill survived and is in bandages.

Film
 A character inspired by Hill named Roscoe Jenkins appears in Batman Returns, portrayed by Michael Murphy.
 Mayor Hill makes a cameo appearance in Batman: Mask of the Phantasm, he has no lines however. Hill's voice actor from the animated series, Lloyd Bochner's son Hart voices major character Arthur Reeves, who is shown in the film to be corrupt unlike Hill and in the comics fought against Hill during the mayoral campaign where Hill emerged victorious thanks to Rupert Thorne.
 In Batman: Under the Red Hood, a newspaper clip revealed that Jason Todd (during his time as Robin) saved Mayor Hamilton Hill's life.

Video games
 Mayor Hamilton Hill appeared in the video game Batman Vengeance, voiced again by Lloyd Bochner. He was blackmailed by Poison Ivy along with other politicians and wealthy socialites with a lethal parasite that will consume his internal organs unless he buys "food" from Ivy. Batman defeats her and manages to devise a cure to save the Mayor's life.
 In Batman: Arkham Origins, the name "Hamilton Hill" can be seen on a sign. During the credits for the story-based campaign expansion "A Cold, Cold Heart", a report can be heard saying that Hill, the current mayor, was resigning following protests caused by the events of the game which saw his police commissioner, Gillian B. Loeb, exposed as a corrupt officer working for Black Mask.

 Mayor Hamilton Hill appears in Batman: The Telltale Series, voiced by Robert Pescovitz. This version of the character has a personal relationship with mobster Carmine Falcone and is currently campaigning to keep his position against crusading district attorney Harvey Dent, whom Bruce Wayne is supporting. After information about Bruce's father Thomas being an old friend of Falcone's is released to the press, Hill authorizes a police search of Wayne Manor in an attempt to intimidate Bruce into dropping his support for Dent's campaign. When Batman confronts Falcone, he learns that both he and Hill had a secret alliance with his parents. After he is revealed to have been working with Penguin and the Children of Arkham to protect himself from their wrath, Hill is confronted by either Bruce Wayne or Batman, with Hill revealing information about the trio's use of Arkham Asylum to gain control of Gotham. After the Children of Arkham show that Hill was partially responsible for Penguin's late mother being committed to Arkham.  Penguin breaks his deal with Hill and kills him. Following his death, Dent is sworn in as Mayor.

Web series
 Hamilton Hill is mentioned in the Gotham Girls episode "Gotham in Pink". Poison Ivy drugged him with a special toxin that makes a root grow out of his forehead. Embarrassed, he is forced to resign from office.

 In Harley Quinn, Mayor Hill is voiced by Jim Rash. While unnamed in all appearances, he bears resemblance to other depictions of the character. First appearing in the season one episode "The Line" during a video conference with Harley and her crew, he takes on a more significant role during the show's third season, which premieres with him in an election against Gordon. Although impaled by a pipe following a bus crash, he survives and maintains a commanding lead over Gordon in the polls until Two-Face (Gordon's campaign manager) poisons him.

Miscellaneous
 In The Batman Adventures, a comic book spin-off of Batman: The Animated Series, the Penguin replaces Hamilton Hill as Mayor of Gotham City thanks to Temple Fugate rigging the votes. Batman foils Fugate and Penguin's plan and Hill is reinstated.
 Mayor Hamilton Hill appears in an issue of The Batman Strikes. He is taken hostage at one of Bruce Wayne's parties by Black Mask.

References

External links
 Hamilton Hill  at DC Comics Wiki
 Hamilton Hill at Comic Vine

Hill, Hamilton
Fictional lawyers
DC Comics male characters
Comics characters introduced in 1981
Characters created by Gerry Conway